The National Committee of the Chinese Banking Workers’ Union is a national industrial union of the All-China Federation of Trade Unions in the People's Republic of China.

External links
basic info from the ACFTU

National industrial unions (China)
Finance sector trade unions